Graham Ryding (born June 16, 1975 in Winnipeg, Manitoba) is a professional male squash player who represented Canada during his career. He reached a career-high world ranking of World No. 10 in November 1999 after having joined the Professional Squash Association in 1993. Ryding was a semi-finalist in the 2004 World Open, a member of the 1997 World Team Championships where Canada placed second and a three-time Canadian National Champion.

Through his playing career, Ryding earned his Bachelor of Commerce from the University of Toronto and, following his retirement in 2007, earned his Chartered Financial Analyst designation in 2009.

External links
 
 
 

1975 births
Living people
Canadian male squash players
World Games bronze medalists
Competitors at the 1997 World Games
Pan American Games gold medalists for Canada
Pan American Games silver medalists for Canada
Pan American Games medalists in squash
Squash players at the 1999 Pan American Games
Squash players at the 2003 Pan American Games
Squash players at the 2006 Commonwealth Games
Sportspeople from Winnipeg
Medalists at the 1999 Pan American Games
Medalists at the 2003 Pan American Games
Commonwealth Games competitors for Canada